is a Japanese manga series written and illustrated by Nekomaki. It has been serialized once in a month in Shogakukan's Josei Seven magazine since May 17, 2018 issue and has been collected in three tankōbon volumes. A short original net animation (ONA) series adaption by Charaction premiered in August 5, 2021 and it's streaming on manga's official Twitter account. Also, this manga was the judges' choice of manga category in 21st Japan Media Arts Festival Awards.

Characters

Media

Manga 
Written by Nekomaki, Tora and Mike serialized in Shogakukan's Josei Seven magazine from May 17, 2018. Shogakukan has been collected it's chapters into three tankōbon volumes. The first volume was published on June 18, 2019.

Anime 
This original net animation (ONA) is produced by Japanese studio Charaction and directed by Yuzo Yamamoto. Planning by Minoru Hirata, art direction by Minobu Yamada and Kyohei Matsuno composed the music.

Notes

References

External links 
 Anime official website 
 Official Twitter 
 

2021 anime ONAs
Animated television series about animals
Anime series based on manga
Josei manga
Shogakukan manga
Slice of life anime and manga